The 2017 Mount Union Purple Raiders football team represented the University of Mount Union in the 2017 NCAA Division III football season. The Purple Raiders, led by fifth-year head coach Vince Kehres, were members of the Ohio Athletic Conference (OAC) and played their home games at Mount Union Stadium in Alliance, Ohio.

Schedule
Mount Union's 2017 schedule consists of 6 home, and 4 away games in the regular season. The Raiders hosted  N.C. Wesleyan, Baldwin Wallace, Ohio Northern, Capital University, Otterbein University, and Muskingum University and traveled to Marietta College, Heidelberg University, Wilmington College, and John Carroll University.

Mount Union had one non–conference game against North Carolina Wesleyan College from the USA South Athletic Conference.

In 2016, Mount Union did not make it to the Stagg Bowl for the first time in eleven years after losing to Mary Hardin-Baylor in the semifinals 14-12. The team finished with a 12-2 record, with an 8-1 record in conference play.

The Purple Raiders ended their season by going to the Stagg Bowl and winning the NCAA Division III National Championship with a 12-0 win over Mary Hardin-Baylor of Texas.

References

Mount Union
Mount Union Purple Raiders football seasons
NCAA Division III Football Champions
College football undefeated seasons
Mount Union Purple Raiders football